The Type 209 is a range of diesel-electric attack submarines developed exclusively for export by Howaldtswerke-Deutsche Werft of Germany. Five class variants (Types 209/1100, 209/1200, 209/1300, 209/1400 and 209/1500), including modifications thereof, have been successfully exported to 15 countries, with 90 submarines being built and commissioned between 1971 and 2021.

The original variant, the Type 209/1100, was designed in the late 1960s with Greece becoming its first adopter. Turkey is the largest adopter, having purchased 14 submarines consisting of eight Type 209/1400 and six Type 209/1200 submarines. A non-specific variant was adopted by Israel as its first Dolphin class. The Type 209 family is the most widely-proliferated submarine in Latin America, having been adopted by seven countries.

Development 
In the early 1970s, many navies began to need replacements for World War II-era submarines, aging United States GUPPY conversions, and British units transferred postwar. During this time, few western submarine designs were available for export as most were large, expensive, sophisticated and difficult to operate, and designed for the Cold War. Several designs originally built for specific nations were available including the French , British , and the Soviet  submarines. The design, designated by the German Ministry of Defense as the "Type 209" provided a solution providing the combination of size, performance, relative ease of operation for small or inexperienced navies, reasonable price and economy of operation.

Design 

The submarine was designed by Ingenieurkontor Lübeck (IKL) headed by Ulrich Gabler and is largely based on previous German submarine designs (in particular the Type 206) with increased equipment. The design is single hulled and allows the commanding officer to see the entire submarine from the bow to stern while standing at the periscope. Four 120-cell batteries are located forward and aft of the command center in the lower deck and make up about 25% of the boat's displacement. Two main ballast tanks with forward and aft trim tanks allow the boat to dive.  They are powered by four MTU diesels and four AEG generators. The AEG electric motor is attached directly to a five- or seven-bladed propeller.

Armaments 

Type 209 submarines are armed with eight bow  torpedo tubes and 14 torpedoes. The Type 209/1200s used by Greece and South Korea, and the Type 209/1400s used by Turkey are also armed with Sub-Harpoon missiles. Boats used by South Korea can be armed with 28 mines in place of torpedoes and Harpoon missiles; while the Indian boats can carry 24 mines externally.

The class can be armed with a variety of torpedo models depending upon the country. The majority of boats carry SUT - Surface and Underwater Target (Greece, India, Indonesia, South Africa, South Korea) or the SST - Special Surface Target (Argentina, Peru, Turkey's 209/1200s, Venezuela) torpedoes. The boats can also carry the Mark 24 Tigerfish (Brazil, Turkey's Preveze class 209/1400), DM2A3 (Colombia), Blackshark (Chile), A184 mod. 3 (Ecuador), DM2A4 (Turkey's Gür class 209/1400) and Mark 37 (Argentina).

Brazil's boats will receive new integrated combat systems from Lockheed Martin to enable use of the Mark 48 torpedo. Successful tests of the new combat system occurred on Tapajó in December 2011.

Service 

Countries operating the Type 209 include Argentina, Brazil, Chile, Colombia, Ecuador, Egypt, Greece, India, Indonesia, Israel, Peru, South Africa, South Korea, Turkey and Venezuela. Iran had an order for six Type 209 submarines that was cancelled by Grand Ayatolla Khomeini in 1979, following the Iranian Revolution. The first user was Greece's Hellenic Navy which commissioned four Type 209/1100s (Glavkos class) between 1971 and 1972 and four Type 209/1200s (Poseidon class) in 1979. Greece is replacing its aging Glavkos class with four Type 214 submarines (Papanikolis class), and Turkey will be replacing early Atılay-class ships with six Type 214 submarines.

Argentina's  was stricken in 1997 after an incomplete overhaul; Greece's Glavkos was decommissioned in 2011; Turkey's TCG Saldıray was decommissioned in 2014 and TCG Atılay decommissioned in 2016; Indonesia's  sank in 2021.

The second user was Argentina which commissioned two Type 209/1200 submarines (Salta class) in 1974. The Argentine Navy supplemented it with two s (Santa Cruz class) commissioned between 1984 and 1985. During the Falklands War (1982), the ARA San Luis performed a war patrol.  While on their way to the area assigned the fire control computer went out of order. The vessel continued on to the combat area, and managed to fire at least 3 wire guided SST-4 mod0 torpedoes at the British fleet. The torpedoes suffered from various issues, with the guide wire cut a minute after launch and the torpedoes going off the assigned course. After the war testing revealed that the torpedoes' electric gyroscopes had reversed polarity, which resulted in a complete refit of the entire Argentinean torpedo stock, and a conversion of a portion of this stock from Mod0 to Mod1, performed by the firm which produced these weapons (AEG). Beside the torpedo issue, San Luis patrolled mostly undetected. 

Colombia commissioned two Type 209/1200s (Pijao class) in 1975. Peru commissioned two Type 209/11s (Islay class) in 1975 and four Type 209/1200s (Angamos class) between 1980 and 1983.

The largest operator of the Type 209 is the Turkish Navy which commissioned six Type 209/1200s (Atılay class) between 1976 and 1989, four Type 209/1400s (Preveze class) between 1994 and 1999, and four more Type 209/1400s (Gür class) between 2003 and 2007. Turkey is also the largest operator of German-designed submarines in the world.

Venezuela commissioned two Type 209/1300s (Sabalo class) between 1976 and 1977. Ecuador commissioned two Type 209/1700s (Shyri class) between 1977 and 1978. Chile commissioned two Type 209/1400s (Thomson class) in 1984.

Indonesia commissioned two Type 209/1300s (Cakra class) in 1981 and three Type 209/1400s (Nagapasa class) between 2017 and 2021. Brazil commissioned three Type 209/1400s (Tupi class) between 1989 and 1999 and a fourth in 2005.

Three Type 209/1400 submarines were delivered to South Africa in 2006, costing $285 million each. India purchased ten s in the 1980s and 1990s.

Egypt initially ordered two Type-209/1400mod submarines in 2011 and later ordered two more in 2014. The shipbuilder TKMS started building the first submarine S41 (861) in March 2012, the vessel was launched in December 2015 after 57 months of construction work. The Egyptian Navy received the S41 in December 2016, the second submarine S42 was launched during the same month. In April 2017, The S41 arrived at its home port in Alexandria and officially entered service, after a long journey from Kiel. Before reaching its naval base, the S41 conducted its first naval exercise with other units from the Egyptian Navy, ensuring its readiness to join the fleet. The Egyptian submarines have 8 x 21-inch (533 mm) torpedo tubes and are able to carry and launch up to 14 missiles and torpedoes, in addition to deploying naval mines. They will be fitted with SeaHake mod 4 torpedoes and UGM-84L Harpoon Block II missiles.

Technical specifications

Variations 

Five variants of this submarine have been produced: Type 209/1100, Type 209/1200, Type 209/1300, Type 209/1400 and Type 209/1500. The U-209PN ordered by the Portuguese Navy is actually a Type 214. The first three s built for the Israeli Navy are based on the Type 209 although heavily modified and enlarged.

Several modifications have occurred in the class resulting in these variants including the fitting of newer diesel engines.  New air conditioning and electronics features have been added to accommodate orders from South America. The displacement in some variants has increased by nearly 50% in order to install new equipment, modernize accommodations, and extend range.

The team of Ingenieurkontor Lübeck (IKL) and Howaldtswerke-Deutsche Werft (HDW) proposed an enlarged Type 209 submarine, the Type 2000, for Australia's  program. The proposed design was roughly 500 tons more than the Type 209/1500s for India and lost to the Type 471 from Kockums, an enlarged .

The Sabalo class built for Venezuela was slightly lengthened during a modernization at HDW in the early 1990s. The increased length is due to the addition of a new sonar dome that is similar to the model found on the German Type 206.

The Tupi class built by the Brazilian Navy is a modified Type 209/1400. The boat is  longer and fitted with higher power diesels, different electric motors, batteries, electronics and sensors.

The Thomson class built for the Chilean Navy has escape hatches fitted in the torpedo and engine room. An additional aft hatch is fitted in the sail with access to the machinery.  The boats are fitted with higher masts to compensate for regional ocean wave conditions.

The Shishumar class built for and by India is unique for having an IKL-designed integrated escape sphere. The sphere has accommodations for the entire crew with an eight-hour air supply.

Between 2004 and 2006, the Indonesian Type 209/1300 submarine  underwent a refurbishment by Daewoo Shipbuilding & Marine Engineering in South Korea. The refurbished submarine featured new batteries, overhauled engines, and modernized combat systems. In 2009, Daewoo won another order to refurbish , which was completed in early 2012. During the two refurbishments, the submarines' existing STN Atlas-Elektronik CSU 3-2 sonar suites were replaced with L-3 ELAC Nautik's LOPAS 8300 passive sonar system and Kongsberg MSI-90U MK2 CMS.

It is also possible to upgrade these submarines with the latest air-independent propulsion (AIP) systems. The first ships to receive this upgrade were to be three ships of the Greek Poseidon class Type 209/1200 under the Neptune II upgrade program. They were to be upgraded by cutting the boat in half aft of the control room and adding a  plug with a 120 kW Siemens AIP system to the ship. The program was canceled in 2009 due to cancellation of the Archimedes Project (Type 214), but not before Okeanos (S118) completed the upgrade. After the Archimedes Project settlement was reached, it was decided that instead of upgrading the remaining two Type 209s, two additional Type 214 ships were to be ordered, but that deal was cancelled by Howaldtswerke-Deutsche Werft. Turkish Navy's AIP upgrade of Atılay class (209 Type 1200) was also shelved in favor of acquiring new Type 214 subs.

Jang Bogo upgrades

The South Korean Jang Bogo-class submarines (Hangul: 장보고급 잠수함, Hanja: 張保皐級潛水艦) have reportedly been heavily upgraded in the 21st century, which if undertaken was supposed to include domestic hull stretch augmentation from 1,200 tons to 1,400 tons and installment of domestically developed Torpedo Acoustic Counter Measures (TACM). Some upgrades could have been affected or altered due to Korean economic problems of the late 1990s, which modified other plans to acquire nine 1,500-ton AIP-equipped boats or upgrade six 1200 boats to 1,500-tons AIP-equipped boats, although the more ambitious plan to acquire nine 1,800-ton Type 214 AIP submarines was preserved and put under progress, not unaided by the quick recovery of the South Korean economy in 1999, which will reportedly be wrapped up in 2018 when all submarines of the type are scheduled to be commissioned. LIG Nex1 began producing TACM for unspecified submarine types of the ROKN as well, which finished development in 2000. Outfitting of the submarines with Sub-Harpoon launching capability was a part of the upgrade, and seems to have been carried out on several submarines by 2008. They can equip the White Shark heavy torpedo, and can possibly equip submarine-launched Hae Sung anti-ship missiles later on. AIP and flank-array sonars are planned for future modernizations.

In December 2011, Daewoo won a contract to build Indonesia three 1,400-ton Jang Bogo class (the ) submarines for $1.07 billion. Construction of the submarines will start in January 2012 for delivery by 2015 and 2016, for commissioning in the first half of 2018. They'll be equipped with torpedoes and guided missiles. The submarines are described to be Korea's original model, bigger and more advanced than Indonesia's refurbished Type 209/1300. Initially the offered submarines were going to be in-service ROKN submarines. The sale will be done without the involvement of German companies. South Korea is currently the only country outside Germany independently offering the Type 209 for sale. Indonesia was also offered two license built Type 209 submarines manufactured by a group of Turkish (SSM - Undersecretariat for Defense Industries) and German companies (HDW/ThyssenKrupp), a deal reported to be valued at $1 billion. SSM was also offering the leases of Type 209 submarines until new submarines could be completed. The offer has since been superseded by the DSME submarine contract. The three new submarines would be equipped with the Kongsberg MSI-90U MK2 combat systems, Indra's Pegaso RESM system and Aries-S LPI radar.

Operators

Individual boats

Gallery

See also 
 
 
 List of submarine classes in service

References

External links 

 ThyssenKrupp Marine Systems - Class 209/1400mod
 Active Diesel submarines - 2002
 Argentine Navy website - Submarine Force - ARA Salta (S-31) specifications 
 Global Security
 Haze Gray & Underway: World Navies Today - (Pre-2003 developments)
 Hellenic Navy's Submarine OCEANOS (S-118) 3d animation
 Shishumar Class
 The U209 Family Evolution 
 U209 operators map

Attack submarines